Kanchikudicharu Tank ( Kanchikudicharu Kuḷam) is an irrigation tank in Eastern Sri Lanka, Ampara district. 

Irrigable area in acres are 1700.

References

Geography of Ampara District